Antolin Aquino Oreta III (born September 16, 1971), better known as Lenlen Oreta, is a Filipino politician who has served as the Mayor of Malabon from 2012 to 2022 and formerly served as Vice Mayor from 2010 up until his appointment as mayor. He is the son of former Senator Tessie Aquino-Oreta.

Background
Oreta was born on September 16, 1971, as the second of the four children of businessman Antolin M. Oreta Jr. and former senator Tessie Aquino-Oreta, with his other siblings being Aurora Rosario, Karmela, and  the adopted Jose Lorenzo.

He completed his elementary education at Stuart Hall School for Boys at San Francisco, California while he completed his secondary education at the Ateneo de Manila University in Manila. He earned his Bachelor's Degree in Japanese Studies at Sophia University in Tokyo.

Career

Professional career

Before he enter the world of politics, Oreta III worked as an Associate for Keppel Securities from 1995–1997 and Assistant Vice President Dealer at Merrill Lynch.  He also became Dealer and Vice President for Finance at ABN-AMRO Securities and Intra Strata Assurance Corporation consecutively.

Political career

Oreta started his political career under the Nationalist People's Coalition when he ran as Councilor of Malabon in 2007.

In 2010, he was elected as Vice Mayor of the same city, this time under the Liberal Party, and later on assumed the position of Acting Mayor replacing his uncle, the late Canuto Oreta, after the latter died of lung cancer in 2012.

In 2013, he ran for the mayoralty race for his first official term and won the election unopposed. Oreta then went on to run for his second and third term during 2016 and 2019 elections, competing against then-Congresswoman Jaye Lacson-Noel and then Vice Mayor Jeannie Sandoval in those respective elections.

Personal life
Oreta married to Melissa D. Sison, a recognized chef by profession.

References

1971 births
Living people
Filipino business executives
People from Manila
Liberal Party (Philippines) politicians
Mayors of Malabon
Ateneo de Manila University alumni
Sophia University alumni
Aquino family
Nationalist People's Coalition politicians